Popoli is a historical region in Kastoria regional unit of Western Macedonia, Greece, between the cities of Kastoria and Klisoura.

Geography 
The area contains the settlements located to the north and east of the lake of Kastoria, on the southern foot of mount Verno (Vitsi) and on the northern foot of mount Askio (Siniatsiko).

References 

Historical regions in Greece